Following is a partial list of notable faculty (either past, present or visiting) of New York University. As of 2014, among NYU's past and present faculty, there are at least 159 Guggenheim Fellows, over 7 Lasker Award winners, and at least 68 are currently elected to the American Academy of Arts and Sciences.

Nobel laureates 

Nobel laureates Daniel Kahneman, Myron Scholes and Robert A. Mundell gave lectures at New York University Tandon School of Engineering as part of the NYU Tandon School of Engineering Lynford Lecture Series.

American Academy of Arts and Sciences

Members of the National Academy of Sciences

Members of the National Academy of Engineering

Guggenheim Fellows

MacArthur Fellows 

Bryan Stevenson, professor at School of Law
Subhash Khot, professor at Courant Institute of Mathematical Sciences.
Julia Wolfe, professor at Steinhardt School of Culture, Education, and Human Development. Also won a Pulitzer Prize.

Rhodes Scholars
Peter Blair Henry, professor at Stern School of Business
John Brademas, professor at Graduate School of Arts and Science
Sujit Choudhry, professor at School of Law. He also served as the Dean of the UC Berkeley School of Law, and as Associate Dean of the University of Toronto
James McNaughton Hester, former professor and Dean of both undergraduate and graduate schools of arts and science at NYU. He became 11th President of NYU.

National Medals for Science, Technology and Innovation, Arts and Humanities recipients

Abel Prize recipients 
Louis Nirenberg, professor at Courant
Peter Lax, professor at Courant
S.R. Srinivasa Varadhan, professor at Courant
Mikhail Leonidovich Gromov, professor at Courant

College of Arts and Science (undergraduate and graduate) 

 Julia Jones-Pugliese (1909–1993), national champion fencer and fencing coach
 Nickolas Muray (born Miklós Mandl; 1892–1965), Hungarian-born American photographer and Olympic fencer
Elisha Netanyahu, mathematician, former Dean of the Faculty of Sciences at Technion. Benjamin Netanyahu, Prime Minister of Israel, is his nephew.

Tandon School of Engineering (formerly Polytechnic School of Engineering)

Courant Institute of Mathematical Sciences
This is a small selection of Courant's famous faculty over the years and a few of their distinctions:

Stern School of Business

Tisch School of the Arts

Gallatin School of Individualized Study
 Sinan Antoon, Iraqi Novelist and Poet
 Taylor Antrim, Novelist and Journalist
 Mitchell Joachim, Sustainable Design, TED Senior Fellow
 Myles Jackson, Historian of Science and Technology 
 John Sexton, President of NYU teaches the seminar "Baseball as a Road to God"
 E. Frances White, former Dean, historian of Africa, African American Studies
 Frank Leon Roberts, writer, commentator, activist

Steinhardt School of Culture, Education, and Human Development

Robert F. Wagner Graduate School of Public Service

School of Law
NYU Law has the second highest number of faculty who are members of the American Academy of Arts and Sciences with 19 inductees, behind only Harvard.

Some of NYU's notable professors include:

 Sonia Sotomayor, Associate Justice of the Supreme Court of the United States
 Preet Bharara, Former United States Attorney for the Southern District of New York
 William Allen (Corporate Law, Chancellor of Delaware)
 Alberto Alemanno (European Union Law)
 Philip Alston (Human Rights)
  Jose Alvarez (International Law)
 Anthony Amsterdam (Criminal Law, Capital Punishment)
 Rachel Barkow (Administrative Law, Criminal Law and Procedure)
 Dorit Beinisch (National Security Law)
 Jerome A. Cohen (Chinese Law)
 Lawrence Collins (Transnational Litigation)
  Donald Donovan (International Arbitration, International Investment Law)
 Richard Epstein (Law and Economics, Torts, Health Law & Policy)
 Cynthia Estlund (Labor Law, Employment Law, Property)
 Samuel Estreicher (Labor Law, Employment Law, Administrative Law)
 Franco Ferrari (Sale of Goods, European Union Law, International Arbitration)
 Barry Friedman (Constitutional Law)
 David W. Garland (Criminal Law, Sociology)
 Stephen Gillers (Legal Ethics)
 Douglas H. Ginsburg (Administrative Law)
 Trevor Morrison (Dean, Constitutional Law)
 Samuel Issacharoff (Procedure, Democracy)
 Sally Katzen (Administrative Law)
 Benedict Kingsbury (International Law)
 John Koeltl (Constitutional Litigation)
 Theodor Meron (International Law)
 Arthur R. Miller (Civil Procedure, Copyright, and Privacy)
 Thomas Nagel (Legal Philosophy)
 Burt Neuborne (Evidence, Holocaust Litigation Expert)
 Richard Pildes (Constitutional Law, Administrative Law, Election Law)
 Richard Revesz (Environmental Law)
 Catherine Sharkey (Tort Law, Empirical Legal Studies)
 John Sexton (Civil Procedure)
  Linda J. Silberman (Conflict of Laws, Civil Procedure, International Arbitration)
 Bryan Stevenson (Criminal Law, Capital Punishment)
 Jeremy Waldron (Legal Philosophy)
 Joseph H. H. Weiler (International Law)
 Kenji Yoshino (Constitutional Law, LGBT Rights)

Grossman School of Medicine

Silver School of Social Work
Notable faculty include:
James Jaccard, Professor of Social Work

NYU Abu Dhabi
Notable faculty include:

NYU Shanghai
 Chen Jian (academic), visiting professor from Cornell University, Chinese history and international relations
 Jeffrey Lehman, former president of Cornell, Dean of University of Michigan law school
 Joanna Waley-Cohen, former head of the NYU New York History department
 Eitan Zemel, associate Chancellor for Strategy and Dean of Business
 Lin Fanghua, associate Provost for the Quantitative Disciplines, also Silver Professor at the Courant Institute of Mathematical Sciences
 Yu Lizhong, former president of East China Normal University
 Jun Zhang, Professor of Physics and Mathematics, Fellow of American Physical Society

Professor emeriti and other notable faculty

New York University Presidents

New York University founders 
Founders of NYU include:
 Morgan Lewis (governor)
 Albert Gallatin

See also

References

Lists of people by university or college in New York City

New York University-related lists